In the NUTS (Nomenclature of Territorial Units for Statistics) codes of Sweden (SE), the three levels are:

NUTS codes

SE SWEDEN (SVERIGE)
SE1 EAST SWEDEN (ÖSTRA SVERIGE)
SE11 Stockholm (Stockholm)
SE110 Stockholm County (Stockholms län)
SE12 East Middle Sweden (Östra Mellansverige)
SE121 Uppsala County (Uppsala län)
SE122 Södermanland County (Södermanlands län)
SE123 Östergötland County (Östergötlands län)
SE124 Örebro County (Örebro län)
SE125 Västmanland County (Västmanlands län)
SE2 SOUTH SWEDEN (SÖDRA SVERIGE)
SE21 Småland and the islands (Småland med öarna)
SE211 Jönköping County (Jönköpings län)
SE212 Kronoberg County (Kronobergs län)
SE213 Kalmar County (Kalmar län)
SE214 Gotland County (Gotlands län)
SE22 South Sweden (Sydsverige)
SE221 Blekinge County (Blekinge län)
SE224 Skåne County (Skåne län)
SE23 West Sweden (Västsverige)
SE231 Halland County (Hallands län)
SE232 Västra Götaland County (Västra Götalands län)
SE3 NORTH SWEDEN (NORRA SVERIGE)
SE31 North Middle Sweden (Norra Mellansverige)
SE311 Värmland County (Värmlands län)
SE312 Dalarna County (Dalarnas län)
SE313 Gävleborg County (Gävleborgs län)
SE32 Middle Norrland (Mellersta Norrland)
SE321 Västernorrland County (Västernorrlands län)
SE322 Jämtland County (Jämtlands län)
SE33 Upper Norrland (Övre Norrland)
SE331 Västerbotten County (Västerbottens län)
SE332 Norrbotten County (Norrbottens län)

NUTS codes prior to 31.12.2007
Prior to 31.12.2007, the codes were as follows:

The National Areas of Sweden are 8 second level subdivisions (NUTS-2) of Sweden, created by the European Union for statistical purposes.

The 8 riksområden (Singular : Riksområde) includes the 21 counties of Sweden. Only Stockholm (SE01) corresponds simply to the homonymous county.

Local administrative units

Below the NUTS levels, the two LAU (Local Administrative Units) levels are:

The LAU codes of Sweden can be downloaded here: ''

NUTS 1 compared to Lands of Sweden
While similar, NUTS 1 doesn't correspond to Lands of Sweden.

See also
List of Swedish regions by Human Development Index
Subdivisions of Sweden
 ISO 3166-2 codes of Sweden
 FIPS region codes of Sweden

External links
 Hierarchical list of the Nomenclature of territorial units for statistics - NUTS and the Statistical regions of Europe
 Overview map of EU Countries - NUTS level 1
 SVERIGE - NUTS level 2
 SVERIGE - NUTS level 3
 Correspondence between the NUTS levels and the national administrative units
 List of current NUTS codes
 Download current NUTS codes (ODS format)
 Counties of Sweden, Statoids.com

References

Sweden
Nuts